Microsoft Sway is a presentation program and is part of the Microsoft Office family of products. Sway was offered for general release by Microsoft in August 2015. It allows users who have a Microsoft account to combine text and media to create a presentable website. Users can pull content locally from the device in use, or from internet sources such as Bing, Facebook, OneDrive, and YouTube. Sway is distinguished from  Microsoft FrontPage and Microsoft Expression Web - unrelated web design programs previously developed by Microsoft - in that Sway includes a method for hosting sites.

Sway sites are stored on Microsoft's servers and are tied to the user's Microsoft account. They can be viewed and edited from any web browser through Office on the web. There is no offline editing or viewing function, but sites can be accessed using apps for Windows 10 and iOS.

History 
Sway was developed internally by Microsoft. In late 2014, the company announced an invite-only preview version of Sway and announced that Sway would not require an Office 365 subscription. An iOS app was released as a preview on 31 October 2014, but was discontinued on 17 December 2018 due to low usage.

, the Sway iOS app's discontinuance in 2018 was the last piece of news posted in the Sway tech blog. The Sway feature blog has not received an update since April 2017. The Microsoft Office Roadmap did not include any items related to Sway ever since. The iOS application is no longer under active development, and is not available for download.

Features 
Users are able to add content from various sources into their Sway presentations. Some of the integrated services are owned by Microsoft, including OneNote, Bing, and other Sway sites. The program also provides native integration with other services, including YouTube, Facebook, Twitter, Mixcloud, and Infogram.

References

External links 
 

Microsoft Office
Web applications
IOS software
Universal Windows Platform apps
2015 software